Knee Lake Water Aerodrome  is located adjacent to Knee Lake, Manitoba, Canada.

See also
 Knee Lake Airport

References

Registered aerodromes in Manitoba
Seaplane bases in Manitoba